

The Dufferin Rifles of Canada was an infantry regiment of the Non-Permanent Active Militia of the Canadian Militia (now the Canadian Army). In 1936, the regiment was Amalgamated with The Haldimand Rifles to form The Dufferin and Haldimand Rifles of Canada (now the 56th Field Artillery Regiment, RCA).

Lineage

The Dufferin Rifles of Canada 

 Originated on 28 September 1866, in Brantford, Ontario, as the 38th Brant Battalion of Infantry.
 Redesignated on 30 November 1866, as the 38th Brant Battalion of Infantry.
 Redesignated on 24 March 1871, as the 38th Brant Battalion of Rifles.
 Redesignated on 3 July 1874, as the 38th Brant Battalion or Dufferin Rifles.
 Redesignated on 28 September 1883, as the 38th Battalion Dufferin Rifles of Canada.
 Redesignated on 8 May 1900, as the 38th Regiment Dufferin Rifles of Canada.
 Redesignated on 1 May 1920, as The Dufferin Rifles of Canada.
 Amalgamated on 15 December 1936, with The Haldimand Rifles and C Company of the 3rd Machine Gun Battalion, CMGC, and Redesignated as The Dufferin and Haldimand Rifles of Canada.

Chart

Perpetuations 

 4th Battalion (Central Ontario), CEF
 36th Battalion, CEF
 125th Battalion (1st Overseas Battalion of 38th Regiment Dufferin Rifles), CEF
 215th Battalion (2nd Overseas Battalion of 38th Regiment Dufferin Rifles), CEF

Organization

38th Brant Battalion of Infantry (28 September 1866) 

 No. 1 Company (1st Brantford Rifles) (Brantford, Ontario) (first raised on 13 December 1861 as the 1st Brantford Rifle Company)
 No. 2 Company (2nd Brantford Rifles) (Brantford, Ontario) (first raised on 3 July 1862 as the 2nd Brantford Highland Rifle Company)
 No. 3 Company (Paris Rifles) (Paris, Ontario) (first raised on 26 June 1856 as the Volunteer Militia Company of Paris)
 No. 4 Company (Mount Pleasant Infantry) (Mount Pleasant, Ontario) (first raised on 30 January 1863 as the Mount Pleasant Infantry Company; later disbanded 6 February 1869)
 No. 5 Company (3rd Brantford Rifles) (Brantford, Ontario) (first raised on 1 June 1866 as the 3rd Brantford Infantry Company)
 No. 6 Company (Burford Infantry) (Burford, Ontario) (first raised on 17 August 1866 as the Burford Infantry Company of Volunteer Militia)
 No. 7 Company (Newport Infantry) (Newport, Ontario) (first raised on 31 August 1866 as the Newport Infantry Company; later disbanded on 14 December 1866)

The Dufferin Rifles of Canada (01 September, 1920) 

 1st Battalion (perpetuating the 4th Battalion, CEF)
 2nd (Reserve) Battalion (perpetuating the 36th Battalion, CEF)
 3rd (Reserve) Battalion (perpetuating the 125th Battalion, CEF)
 4th (Reserve) Battalion (perpetuating the 215th Battalion, CEF)

Battle honours 
In 1929, the regiment was granted these honours for the Great War. The list is identical to the honours granted at the same time to the 4th Canadian Infantry Battalion, CEF. 
 Ypres 1915, '17
 Gravenstafel
 St. Julien
 Festubert, 1915
 Mount Sorrel
 Somme, 1916
 Pozières
 Flers-Courcelette
 Ancre Heights
 Arras 1917, '18
 Vimy, 1917
 Arleux
 Scarpe, 1917, '18
 Hill 70
 Passchendaele
 Amiens
 Drocourt–Quéant
 Hindenburg Line
 Canal du Nord
 Pursuit to Mons
 France and Flanders, 1915–18

Notable Members 

 Sergeant William Merrifield 
 Lieutenant-General Ernest Charles Ashton

References 

Former infantry regiments of Canada
Rifle regiments of Canada
Rifle regiments
Military units and formations of Ontario